Capital FM (sometimes called Capital Radio or 91.3 Capital FM) is an English radio channel broadcasting from Kampala, Uganda at 91.3 MHz and covers the whole of Uganda with some parts of Northern Tanzania, Rwanda, Eastern Congo, and western Kenya. It covers the rest of the world through a streaming service on the station's website.

Aside from the 91.3 MHz frequency which broadcasts from Kampala, the radio station also broadcasts on 90.9 MHz in Mbale, 96.9 MHz in Gulu, and 89.4 MHz in Fort Portal and 88.7 MHz in Mbarara. This wide coverage makes Capital FM the most listened to radio station in Uganda.

Capital FM boasts programs including the Big Breakfast Show, The Capital Gang, The Late Date and Dance Force. Other programs like AM-PM Show, The Overdrive and The Dream Breakfast remain some of the most listened to programs in the country.

Presenters
 Flavia Tumusiime
 Gaetano Jukko Kagwa
Lucky Mbabazi

The brain game
"The brain game" is a program run by Capital Radio. Each hour, during the day, the same question is asked. If the right answer is not given, Uganda Shs. 10,000 is added to the jackpot until the next hour, when the same is repeated. The brain game can go on for over eight months as listeners call in, trying to win the money.

Former presenters
 Jackie Lumbasi - The Big Breakfast now Gaetano & Lucky in the Morning, Your Choice
Juliana Kanyomozi - Your Choice, The Overdrive Show (then Home Run Team with Gaetano)
Christine Mawadri - The Big Breakfast Show
Lilian Mbabazi - The Big Breakfast Show
Karitas Karisimbi The Big Breakfast Show
Joy Doreen Biira - The Dream Breakfast Show, Sunday Drive
Alan Kasujja - The Big Breakfast Show, Desert Island Discs
Cleopatra Koheirwe - The Overdrive Show, The Dream Breakfast Show
 Tattu Sophie - The Dream Breakfast/The Overdrive Show/Saturday Drive 
 Marcus Kwikiriza - The Big Breakfast 
 Flo Qitui - Your Choice

References

External links 
 "The 20-year journey of FM radio in Uganda"
 "FM Radio broadcasting in Uganda turns 20 this month"
 "Capital FM Uganda"

Radio broadcasting companies of Uganda
Ugandan music
Radio stations in Uganda
Kumusha